Philotheca linearis, commonly known as the rock wallaby shrub or narrow-leaf wax-flower, is a species of flowering plant in the family Rutaceae and is endemic to an inland areas of southern Australia. It is a shrub with glandular-warty branchlets and leaves, club-shaped to cylindrical leaves and white flowers arranged singly in leaf axils.

Description
The ten stamens are free from each other and hairy.

Taxonomy
This philotheca was first formally described in 1837 by Stephan Endlicher from an unpublished description by Allan Cunningham who gave it the name Eriostemon linearis. Endlicher published the description in the Enumeratio plantarum quas in Novae Hollandiae ora austro-occidentali ad fluvium Cygnorum et in sinu Regis Georgii collegit Carolus Liber Baro de Hügel. The type specimens were collected by Cunningham on the "Barren Ranges on the Lachlan River" in June 1817. In 1998, Wilson changed the name to Philotheca linearis in the journal Nuysia.

Distribution and habitat
Philotheca linearis on and around rock outcrops from the Great Victoria Desert in Western Australia and east to the Everard, Gawler and Flinders Ranges in South Australia and the Cobar – Bourke – Broken Hill area of New South Wales.

Conservation status
In Western Australia, P. linearis is classified as "Priority One" by the Government of Western Australia Department of Parks and Wildlife, meaning that it is known from only one or a few locations which are potentially at risk.

References

linearis
Flora of New South Wales
Flora of South Australia
Flora of Western Australia
Sapindales of Australia
Plants described in 1837
Taxa named by Allan Cunningham (botanist)
Taxa named by Stephan Endlicher